The Hungarian Athletics Association (MASZ)  is the governing body for the sport of athletics in Hungary.

Affiliations 
MASZ is the national member federation for Hungary in the following international organisations:
International Association of Athletics Federations (IAAF)
European Athletic Association (EAA)
Hungarian Olympic Committee

Moreover, it is part of the following national organisations:
Hungarian Olympic Committee (Hungarian: Magyar Olimpiai Bizottság)

International events hosted
 1966 European Athletics Championships – Budapest, 30 August - 4 September
 1998 European Athletics Championships – Budapest, 18–23 August
 1989 IAAF World Indoor Championships – Budapest, 3–5 March
 2004 IAAF World Indoor Championships – Budapest, 5–7 March
 1983 European Athletics Indoor Championships – Budapest, 5–6 March
 1988 European Athletics Indoor Championships – Budapest, 5–6 March

Medalists

at Olympic Games

at World Championships

 IAAF World Championships in Athletics (outdoor)

 IAAF World Indoor Championships in Athletics (indoor)

 IAAF World Race Walking Cup

at European Championships

Kit suppliers
Hungarian kits are currently supplied by Nike.

Presidents

National records 
MASZ maintains the Hungarian records in athletics.

See also
Hungarian Athletics Championships

External links 
Magyar Atlétikai Szövetség (official website)

Hungary
Athletics
National governing bodies for athletics